David Bottrill is a Canadian record producer. He has won three Grammys. Formerly, he owned Rattlebox Studios in Toronto, Ontario with producer Brian Moncarz. Moneen, Basia Lyjak, and The Getaway Plan are among the artists to have recorded at the facility.

Production credits

Bottrill's production credits include the following:

 Peter Gabriel - So (1986)
 Peter Gabriel -  Passion (1989)
 Peter Gabriel -  Us (1992)
 David Sylvian & Robert Fripp - The First Day (1993)
 David Sylvian & Robert Fripp - Darshan (The Road To Graceland) (1993)
 Toni Childs - The Woman's Boat (1994)
 King Crimson - Vroom - 1994
 King Crimson - Thrak (1995)
 Tool - Ænima (1996)
 Remy Zero - Villa Elaine (1998)
 Ultraspank - Ultraspank (1998)
 dEUS - The Ideal Crash (1999)
 Dream Theater - Metropolis Pt. 2: Scenes from a Memory (1999) (only tracks 1, 9, 10, and 12 used his mix. See below)
 Tool - Salival (2000)
 Tool - Lateralus (2001)
 Muse - Origin of Symmetry (2001)
 Flaw - Through the Eyes (2001)
 Mudvayne - The End of All Things to Come (2002)
 Silverchair - Diorama (2002)
 Erase the Grey - 27 Days EP (2002)
 Dream Theater - The Making of Scenes from a Memory: The Alternate Mix (2003) (first release of his unused mixes of tracks 2-8 and 11, which were remixed by Kevin Shirley for the original album)
 Godsmack - Faceless (2003)
 V Shape Mind - Cul-De-Sac (2003)
 I Mother Earth - The Quicksilver Meat Dream (2003)
 Flaw - Endangered Species  (2004)
 Staind - Chapter V (2005)
 Coheed and Cambria - Good Apollo, I'm Burning Star IV, Volume One: From Fear Through the Eyes of Madness (2005)
 Kristin Hoffmann - Real (2005)
 Blackbud - From The Sky (2006)
 Fair to Midland - Fables From a Mayfly: What I Tell You Three Times is True (2007)
 Silverchair - Young Modern (2007)
 Placebo - Battle for the Sun (2009)
 Moneen - The World I Want to Leave Behind (2009)
 Counterfit fifty - second studio album (2009)
 Everyone's Talking - Dragonflies (2009)
 Circa Survive - Blue Sky Noise (2010)
 Negramaro - Casa 69 (2010)
 Circa Survive - "Appendage (EP)" (2010)
 Between The Buried And Me - The Parallax: Hypersleep Dialogues (2011)
 dEUS - Keep You Close (2011)
 Jesse Clegg - Life On Mars (album) (2011)
 The Getaway Plan - Requiem (2011)
 Soen - Cognitive (2012)
 dEUS - Following Sea (2012) co-producer on "The Soft Fall" and "Crazy About You"
 Wallace Vanborn - Lions, Liars, Guns & God (2012)
 The Smashing Pumpkins - Oceania (album) (2012)
 A Friend in London - Unite (2012)
 Stone Sour - House of Gold & Bones – Part 1 (2012)
 Stone Sour - House of Gold & Bones – Part 2 (2013)
 Dreamers - Strictly Business EP (Vocal Production) (2013)
 Killing Off Characters - Killing Off Characters (Mixing) (2013)
 The Smashing Pumpkins - Oceania Live in NYC (2013)
 Rush - Vapor Trails Remixed (2013)
 The Post War - H (2014)
 La Esfinge - El Cantar de la Muerte (2014)
 Chiodos - Devil (2014)
 Otherwise - Peace At All Costs (2014)
 The Tea Party - The Ocean at the End (Mixing) (2014)
 The Sixxis - Hollow Shrine (2014)
 Lapko - Freedom (2015)
 Birds of Tokyo - Brace (2016)
 Klogr - Keystone (2017)
Maple Run - PartyKrasher (2017)
 La Jarry - Babylon (2018)
Godsmack -Icon (2019)
Lowest of the Low - AgitPop (2019)
 IAMX - Echo Echo (2020)
Elsiane - Sinai (2020)
 DELANILA - Overloaded (2020)
Briar Summers - From the Ashes (2021)
SISKA'S Element - Guiding Light (2021)
A Calmer Collision - A Calmer Collision (2021)
 Mastodon - Hushed and Grim (2021)

External links
  David Bottrill website

References

Living people
Canadian record producers
Year of birth missing (living people)